Mark Trammell Quartet, previously Mark Trammell Trio, is a Southern gospel quartet, founded by Mark Trammell, who formerly sang with The Kingsmen, Gold City Quartet, The Cathedrals, and Greater Vision.

Group history
The group began in 2002 as a trio consisting of Eric Philips, Mark Trammell, and Joseph Smith. Tenor Joel Wood performed with the quartet from 2008 through 2011 until Eric Phillips returned. In 2013, Eric Phillips once again returned to Law Enforcement work, so a search for a new tenor went out, until Dustin Black, a brand new Southern Gospel tenor was discovered. Dustin Sweatman served for 6 years as lead singer and pianist, from 2006 through September 2012. When Dustin Sweatman stepped down as lead singer in 2012, Mark's son Nick Trammell came on board as their new lead singer and is still present with the group. In 2009 Pat Barker joined the group as bass and the quartet was formed. In 2014, Pat Barker felt it was time to leave the road, so Randy Byrd, formerly of the Lefevre Quartet, began singing bass with the group. Blake Buffin joined as the new tenor in the Summer of 2015. Buffin departed the group in The Inspirations in 2019, and Stephen Adair from The Dixie Echoes was selected as the new tenor.

Members (past and present)

Line-ups

Cathedrals Family Reunion Members

Line-ups

Discography

References

External links 
 

American Christian musical groups
Gospel quartets
Musical groups established in 2009
Southern gospel performers